Dendrobium moorei, commonly known as the drooping cane orchid, is a species of epiphytic or lithophytic orchid in the family Orchidaceae and is endemic to Lord Howe Island. It has cylindrical pseudobulbs, leathery, dark green leaves and between two and fifteen small, white drooping flowers that do not open widely.

Description
The sepals and petals are pointed, thin and do not open widely. Flowering occurs between August and May.

Taxonomy and naming
Dendrobium moorei was first formally described in 1869 by Ferdinand von Mueller from a specimen collected by Charles Moore. The description was published in Fragmenta phytographiae Australiae. The specific epithet (moorei) honours the collector of the type specimen.

Distribution and habitat
The drooping cane orchid grows on trees and rocks in humid, sheltered forests, usually at altitudes of above  on Lord Howe Island.

References

External links 
 

moorei
Endemic orchids of Australia
Endemic flora of Lord Howe Island
Endangered flora of Australia
Plants described in 1869
Taxa named by Ferdinand von Mueller